Mordechai Nessyahu (September 25, 1929 – April 23, 1997) was an Israeli political theorist and philosopher of science, as well as the originator of a worldview he called cosmotheism.

Biography
While studying physics and philosophy at the Hebrew University, Nessyahu began to formulate the worldview he eventually called cosmotheism. He exchanged several letters on the subject with Albert Einstein. In 1953 he published a book in Hebrew entitled מדע הקוסמוס וחברת המדע (Cosmic Science and the Scientific Society) which became the foundation of his eventual cosmotheistic formulation. Moshe Sharett, soon to be Israel's second prime minister, was so impressed by the book that he shared it with Prime Minister David Ben-Gurion. As a result, Nessyahu was appointed Director of the Research Department of the Israeli Labor Party. Nessyahu remained in this position until his death.

In 1968 he met Tsvi Bisk, a new immigrant from the United States, who became his assistant at the Research Department. This meeting triggered a renewed interest in cosmotheism with Bisk as his collaborator and translator. Numerous English-language drafts of the idea were produced over the years and sent to hundreds of thinkers around the world to solicit their opinions. The year he died Nessyahu finally published his work in book form in Hebrew.

The cosmotheistic hypothesis

The cosmotheistic hypothesis stipulates that the Big Bang that created our cosmos was a local event in an infinite universe — a universe that contains an infinite number of cosmoi (what is now being speculated by theoretical physicists as the multiverse). It proposes that this cosmos is an evolutionary entity, in a constant state of ever growing complexity — that eventually has produced conscious life. It posits that due to the evolutionary nature of cosmic development, now being revealed by the "new physics" and "new cosmology", it is statistically certain that huge numbers of conscious life-forms (equivalent in self-awareness to human beings) have arisen throughout the cosmos; as if conscious life has been sown (as a cosmic genome) throughout the cosmos by the very process of cosmic evolution.

Nessyahu postulated that a number of these conscious life-forms will conclude that they must strive to become part of the God-ing of the cosmos. The expansion of conscious life throughout the cosmos will eventually be unfettered by its physical limitations and ultimately conscious life will fill the entire cosmos; it will become co-eval with a cosmos that has dissolved into pure radiation as an inevitable consequence of entropy. Thus the cosmos will become in its entirety a conscious universal being — i.e., the cosmos will have become God. Cosmotheism posits God as the consequence of the cosmos and not as its cause. Not in the beginning God created the cosmos but in the end the evolutionary cosmos will have created God.

From cosmotheism to cosmodeism
Since several racist groups co-opted the name cosmotheism, Nessyahu's living colleague Tsvi Bisk decided to rename Nessyahu's hypothesis cosmodeism, a name closer to the tradition of natural theology which cosmodeism best reflects. Bisk is presently writing a book entitled Cosmodeism: A Worldview for the Space Age.

Publications
(all in Hebrew)

Mada Ha'Cosmos ve-Hevrat Ha'Mada (Cosmic Science and the Scientific Society); Tel Aviv: Katavim, 1953
Darkah shel Mapai (The Way of Mapai); Israel: Beit Berl, 1958
Ha-Mahapekhah ha-mada'it ṿeha-olam ha-mitpate'aḥ (The Scientific Revolution and the Developing World); Tel Aviv: Am Oved, 1965
Yiśrael ke-etgar: mi-20 la-medinah li-shenat 2000 (Israel as a challenge: from the State's 20th anniversary to the year 2000). Tel Aviv: Am Oved, 1969
Peace Time, Facts and Thoughts on the Oslo Track. Israel, 1994
Ḳosmoteizm (Cosmotheism). Ramat Gan: Poeṭiḳah, 1997

References

1929 births
1997 deaths
20th-century Israeli philosophers
Burials at Yarkon Cemetery
Israeli political scientists
20th-century political scientists